Antonne-et-Trigonant is a commune in the Dordogne department in Nouvelle-Aquitaine in southwestern France.

Population

Sights and monuments
 Saint Martin church
 Château de Trigonant, 15th-16th centuries, listed monument historique 
 Château des Bories, 15th-16th centuries, classified monument historique, privately owned, open to the public in July and August
 Pigeon loft at Bories
 Château de Lanmary, 15th-18th centuries, now a convalescence centre
 Maison forte du Pot, fortified house, 15th century

See also
Communes of the Dordogne département

References

Communes of Dordogne